Paradise Street is a street in Liverpool, Merseyside in the Liverpool One shopping area. It lies south of Whitechapel and north of Duke Street.

The street contains many stores and restaurants including McDonald's, USC, Urban Outfitters, Sports Direct, Apple Store, JD Sports, Superdry, Starbucks, Bose and John Lewis.

Streets in Liverpool